Lyubitskoye is the name of several rural localities in Russia:
 Lyubitskoye, a village in Kurchatovsky District, Kursk Oblast
 Lyubitskoye, a selo in Medvensky District, Kursk Oblast
 Lyubitskoye, a selo in Pugachyovsky District, Saratov Oblast